The Loyola Marymount Lions are the athletic teams that represent Loyola Marymount University, a Jesuit institution in Los Angeles, California. The school competes in NCAA Division I and the West Coast Conference.

Sports sponsored

Baseball

The Lions have produced 30 future Major Leaguers, including Billy Bean, MLB's Vice President and Special Assistant to the Commissioner, First-Team All-American and West Coast Conference Player of the Year Billy Traber, two-time Major League Baseball All-Star CJ Wilson, and David Fletcher.

The Lions have been to the College World Series once, in 1986, and also recorded 9 NCAA appearances, and 10 West Coast Conference Championships (three Championship Series and seven regular season).

The Lions play home games at George C. Page Stadium, a 1,200 seat stadium which has been home to the program since 1983.

Men's basketball

The Lions burst onto the national basketball scene in the late 1980s under coach Paul Westhead. His teams led Division I in scoring in 1988 (110.3 points per game), 1989 (112.5) and 1990 (122.4). LMU's 122.4 point per game in 1990 was still a record as of October 2010. As of October 2010, Loyola Marymount held the five highest combined scoring games in Division I history. Four of the five occurred during Westhead's career, including a record 331 in the 181–150 win over United States International University on January 31, 1989.

The team's last appearance in the NCAA Division I men's basketball tournament was in 1990, where they advanced to the Elite Eight. They would lose to eventual national champion UNLV. Prior to the tournament, Lions star player Hank Gathers died during the WCC conference tournament from a heart condition.

LMU's current men's head coach is Stan Johnson.

Women's basketball

The Lions won their first ever West Coast Conference title in 2004, going 24-6 (13-1) while beating Gonzaga to go to the NCAA tournament.

Men's soccer

Michael Erush was a Loyola Marymount University Lions men's soccer standout, a four-time All-West Coast Conference (WCC) selection (2000, 2001, 2002), was named First Team in 2003, and served as team captain during his junior and senior seasons. He was named First Team National Soccer Coaches Association of America All Far West Selection in 2002, and was named First Team All-America by the Jewish Sports Review in 2003. During his last three years, he helped the Lions advance to the NCAA Tournament, and in 2003 finished in a first-round bye and national seeding (#13) in the postseason. He was inducted into the Loyola Marymount Athletics Hall of Fame in 2017.

Beach volleyball
The Lions fielded their first beach volleyball team during the 2012 season. The Lions won their first WCC Championship in 2019, which they defended in 2021 and 2022 (championships were not held in 2020 due to COVID-19). In 2021, the Lions were selected for their first NCAA Beach Volleyball Championship in Gulf Shores, Alabama, where they became the first team since the inaugural season to win its first two matches. The team entered the field of eight as the number five seed and finished the 2021 NCAA Beach Volleyball Championship in third place.

Water polo
The women's water polo team was the WWPA Champion in 2001, 2002, 2003, 2004, 2005, and 2007.

At the conclusion the 2004 season, Loyola Marymount's women's water polo team lost to the University of Southern California, 10-8, in the NCAA Women's Water Polo Championship game at Stanford University's Avery Aquatic Center.

Former varsity sports team
Football
Men's Ice Hockey
Men's Volleyball (Reid Priddy, LMU Class of 2000 graduate, played volleyball for the Loyola Marymount Lions. He went on to win Olympic gold & bronze medals for the USA.)

Athletic facilities
Gersten Pavilion – Men's and women's basketball, Volleyball
George C. Page Stadium – Baseball

Notes

References

External links